The discography of SST Records, an American punk rock independent record label formed in Long Beach, California, and based for years in nearby Lawndale, ranges from releases in 1979 to the present. Founded by Black Flag guitarist Greg Ginn, the label released records by punk bands such as Black Flag, the Minutemen and Hüsker Dü during the 1980s.

Discography
This list is organized by catalog number, a roughly chronological number system established by the label and typically printed on or assigned to each official release.

See also
List of SST Records bands

References

Discographies of American record labels
Punk rock discographies